The Yakovlev Yak-42 (NATO reporting name: "Clobber") is a 100/120-seat three-engined mid-range passenger jet developed in the mid 1970s to replace the technically obsolete Tupolev Tu-134. It was the first airliner produced in the Soviet Union to be powered by modern high-bypass turbofan engines.

Development

In 1972, the Yakovlev design bureau started work on a short- to medium-range airliner capable of carrying 100–120 passengers. It was intended to be a replacement for the Tupolev Tu-134 jet as well as the Ilyushin Il-18, Antonov An-24 and An-26 turboprop airliners.  While the new airliner was required to operate out of relatively small airfields while maintaining good economy, as many Soviet airports had been upgraded to accommodate more advanced aircraft, it did not have to have the same ability to operate from grass strips as Yakovlev's smaller Yak-40. The requirement resulted in the largest, heaviest and most powerful aircraft designed by Yakovlev, until the even larger MC-21 took flight in 2017.

Initial design proposals included a straight-wing airliner powered by two Soloviev D-30 turbofans and resembling an enlarged Yak-40, but this was rejected as it was considered uncompetitive compared to Western airliners powered by high bypass ratio turbofans. Yakovlev settled on a design powered by three of the new Lotarev D-36 three-shaft high-bypass turbofans, which were to provide 63.90 kN (14,330 lbf) of thrust. Unlike the Yak-40, the new airliner would have swept wings.

The first of three prototypes, which was fitted with an 11-degree wing and registered SSSR-1974, made its maiden flight on 7 March 1975. It was followed by the second prototype, (SSSR-1975) with the 23-degree wing and a cabin with 20 rows of windows instead of 17 in the first prototype, and a third prototype (SSSR-1976) fitted with improved de-icing gear.

Design

The Yak-42 is a low-winged monoplane of all-metal construction, with a design lifespan of 30,000 one-hour flights. It has a pressurised fuselage of circular section, with the cabin designed to carry 120 passengers in six-abreast layout (or 100 passengers for local services with greater space allocated to carry-on luggage and coat stowage). The aircraft is flown by a flight crew of two pilots sitting side by side in a flight deck forward of the cabin. Access is via two airstairs, one in the underside of the rear fuselage, like that of the Yak-40, and one forward of the cabin on the port side. Two holds are located under the cabin, carrying baggage, cargo and mail.

 
All of the prototypes had main landing gear with two wheels each, with the first serial production aircraft, four main wheels were introduced. The wing layout underwent considerable revision during the design process, with the first prototype being built with a wing sweep of 11 degrees and the second prototype with a sweep of 23 degrees. After evaluation, the greater sweep of the second prototype was chosen for production. Early aircraft had a clean wing leading edge with no control surfaces, and plain trailing edge flaps. This changed in later aircraft, which were fitted with leading edge slats, with the trailing edge flaps slotted.

Two engines were mounted in pods on either side of the rear fuselage, with the third embedded inside the rear fuselage, fed with air via an "S-duct" air inlet. An auxiliary power unit (APU) is also fitted in the rear fuselage. No thrust reversers are fitted. The aircraft has a T-tail, with both the vertical fin and the horizontal surfaces swept.

Operational history

The first production aircraft was completed on 28 April 1978, with the first scheduled passenger flight, on the Aeroflot Moscow-Krasnodar route taking place on 22 December 1980. Production was at first slow, with only 10 flown by mid-1981. Initial aircraft were fitted for 120 seats in a three-plus-three arrangement.  This was soon changed to a first class section with two-plus-two seating, and a main cabin with 96 seats, giving a total of 104 seats.

In its first year of operation Aeroflot's Yak-42s carried about 200,000 passengers, mainly on routes from Moscow, but also on international services from Leningrad to Helsinki and from Donetsk to Prague, with the type being planned to enter wider service throughout the Aeroflot fleet. On 28 June 1982, however, the tailplane detached from an Aeroflot Yak-42 in flight owing to a failure of the actuator screw jack, causing the aircraft to fatally crash near Mazyr. The type was grounded as a result, not returning to service until October 1984.

An export order for seven aircraft was announced in 1982 by Aviogenex of Yugoslavia, but the contract lapsed. The availability of the longer-range Yak-42D variant from 1991 onwards gave rise to a few more export sales, to Bosnia, China, Cuba, and Iran. As of 1 January 1995 a total of 185 Yak-42 had been produced, including 105 Yak-42Ds.

Variants

Yak-42
Original production version. Max. takeoff weight 54,000 kg (119,050 lb).
Yak-42ML
Version with modified avionics for use on international use (mezhdunarodnyye linii – international services). Entered service in July 1981 on the Leningrad-Helsinki route.
Yak-42D
Long-range version (Dahl'niy – long range) increased fuel. Replaced standard Yak-42 in production. 
Yak-142
Derivative of Yak-42D with updated, western AlliedSignal avionics, spoilers to allow faster descent and enlarged cabin door to accommodate jet bridge. Also designated Yak-42A, Yak-42-100 and Yak-42D-100.
Yak-42R
Yak-42 used as testbed for radar for Yakovlev Yak-141 fighter.
Yak-42F
Conversion of a Yak-42 for geophysical survey and environmental monitoring. Fitted with large underwing pods containing electro-optical sensors. 
Yak-42LL
Conversion as testbed for Progress D-236 propfan engine. Single D-236 (rated at 8,090 kW (10,850shp)) mounted in place of starboard engine, on special pylon to give sufficient clearance for 4.2 m (13 ft 9¾ in) propellers. First flew 15 March 1991.
Yak-42M
A projected but unbuilt stretched airliner. Planned to be powered by three Progress D-436 turbofans, a stretched fuselage and new wings. Design developed into Yak-242.
Yak-242
Further developed Yak-42M, with two underwing Aviadvigatel PS-90 turbofans. Design evolved into Irkut MC-21.

Operators
As of July 2019, 22 Yak-42s remained in commercial airline service. Operators are Izhavia (8), KrasAvia (10) and Turukhan Airlines (4).

Accidents and incidents
As of 15 February 2018, nine fatal Yak-42 accidents have occurred with a total of 570 casualties.

28 June 1982
Aeroflot Flight 8641, a Yak-42 (CCCP-42529) lost control, entered a dive, broke up in mid-air and crashed near Verbovichi, Naroulia District following a failure of the horizontal stabilizer jackscrew due to fatigue caused by design flaws, killing all 132 on board. All Yak-42s were grounded until the defect was rectified in October 1984. The accident remains the deadliest involving the Yak-42 as well as the deadliest in Belarus to date.

September 1986
An Aeroflot Yak-42 (CCCP-42536) was being used for security forces training when a thunderflash ignited the interior. The aircraft burned out, but there were no casualties.

14 September 1990
Aeroflot Flight 8175, a Yak-42 (CCCP-42351), struck trees and crashed short of the runway at Koltsovo Airport after the pilot intentionally deviated from the approach pattern, killing four of 129 on board.

31 July 1992
China General Aviation Flight 7552, a Yak-42D (B-2755), overran the runway on takeoff from Nanjing Dajiaochang Airport after failing to lift off, killing 107 (or 108) of 126 on board. The horizontal stabilizer had been trimmed in the landing position.

20 November 1993
Avioimpex Flight 110, a Yak-42D (RA-42390) leased from Saravia, struck the side of Mount Trojani (near Ohrid) due to pilot error, killing all 116 on board. Macedonian investigators blamed the accident on an inoperable VOR beacon and pilot error, while Russia claimed a misunderstanding from ATC because the controller spoke Macedonian while the crew used Russian and English in their transmissions. The accident remains the deadliest in North Macedonia.

17 December 1997
Aerosvit Flight 241, a Yak-42 (UR-42334) leased from Lviv Airlines, struck the side of Mount Pente Pigadia in the Pierian Mountains due to pilot error and confusion in the cockpit, killing all 70 on board.

25 December 1999

26 May 2003
UM Airlines Flight 4230, a Yak-42D (UR-42352) struck a mountain near Maçka, Trabzon in poor visibility due to pilot error, killing all 75 on board. The aircraft was flying 62 Spanish soldiers, members of the ISAF mission operating in Afghanistan, back to Spain.

7 September 2011
 2011 Lokomotiv Yaroslavl plane crash, a YAK-Service Yak-42D (RA-42434), stalled and crashed shortly after takeoff from Tunoshna Airport due to pilot error; of the 45 on board, only the mechanic survived; 29 members of the KHL hockey team Lokomotiv Yaroslavl were among the dead.

Specifications (Yak-42D)

See also

References

 "Aeroflot completes one year of Yak-42 operations". Flight International, 30 January 1982. p. 208.
 
 Gordon, Yefim, Dmitry Komissarov and Sergey Komissarov. OKB Yakovlev: A History of the Design Bureau and its Aircraft. Hinkley, UK: Midland Publishing, 2005. .
 Gunston, Bill and Yefim Gordon. Yakovlev Aircraft since 1924. London, UK: Putnam Aeronautical Books, 1997. .
 Taylor, Joihn W. R. Jane's All The World's Aircraft 1982–83. London: Jane's Yearbooks, 1982. .
 Taylor, Michael J. H. Brassey's World Aircraft & Systems Directory 1999/2000. London: Brassey's, 1999. .
 Thisdell, Dan and Morris, Rob. "World Airliner Census". Flight International, Vol. 194, No. 5650, 21 August–3 September 2018. . pp. 24–47.
 Thisdell, Dan and Seymour, Chris. "World Airliner Census". Flight International, Vol. 196, No. 5694, 30 July–5 August 2019. . pp. 24–47.

External links 

 Yakovlev design bureau official site

1970s Soviet airliners
Yak-042
Trijets
T-tail aircraft
Aircraft first flown in 1975
Low-wing aircraft